The 1985–87 FIRA Trophy was the 26th edition of a European rugby union championship for national teams. It was played along two seasons (1985–1986 and 1986–87)

The tournament was won by France, who only awarded caps in the games with Romania. France won nine matches and had a single surprising loss to the Soviet Union (15–9), at home. This was the last FIRA Trophy before the first Rugby World Cup, that took place in 1987. Romania and Italy, who finished at 3rd and 4th places, respectively, were among the nine countries invited to participate. The Soviet Union declined the invitation for political reasons, due to the South Africa membership of IRFB. The African side of Tunisia finished in 5th place and was relegated, managing to defeat twice Portugal and having a surprise win over the strong Romania side (17–15) at home. Portugal lost all their ten games and was also relegated, with his best result being a close loss to Italy abroad by 26–24.

Spain and Netherlands won the Division 2 pools, facing each other in a final won by Spain (28–10).

First division 

 Tunisia and Portugal relegated to second division

Second division

Pool A

Pool B

Final 

 Spain promoted to division 1

Bibliography 
 Francesco Volpe, Valerio Vecchiarelli (2000), 2000 Italia in Meta, Storia della nazionale italiana di rugby dagli albori al Sei Nazioni, GS Editore (2000) .
 Francesco Volpe, Paolo Pacitti (Author), Rugby 2000, GTE Gruppo Editorale (1999).

References

External links
1985-87 FIRA Trophy at ESPN

1985-87
1985–86 in European rugby union
1986–87 in European rugby union
1985 rugby union tournaments for national teams
1986 rugby union tournaments for national teams
1987 rugby union tournaments for national teams